The Capital Football W-League is an association football league competition run by Capital Football for women's club teams located in the southern and central parts of the North Island, New Zealand.

It is at the second level of New Zealand Football, below the national association-based Women's National League, and is the highest level of club based football available to teams within the Capital region.

League history
The Capital Football W-League was formed for the 2017 season after a review of the end of the 2016 Women's Central League season. It was previously known as the Women's Central League.

Central Football W-League Clubs

Capital Football awards
The following awards were won at the Capital Football awards for the 2020 Capital Football W-League season.

Women's W-League Player of the Year

 Charlotte Wilford Carroll – Wellington United

Women's Young Player of the Year

 Charlotte Wilford Carroll – Wellington United

Records

Past Champions
Note: The competition used to be called the Women's Central League until 2017 when it became the W-League

2005 – Marist
2006 – Seatoun
2007 – Seatoun
2008 – Seatoun
2009 – Marist
2010 – Marist
2011 – Waterside Karori
2012 – Massey University
2013 – Massey University
2014 – Massey University
2015 – Seatoun
2016 – Wellington United
2017 – Upper Hutt City
2018 – Wellington United
2019 – Wellington United
2020 – Wellington United
2021 – Wellington United

Source: Capital Football Yearbooks

References

2